Van der Weijden is a Dutch toponymic surname meaning "from the meadows", which often referred to the village greens. The most common spelling variant is Van der Weide and other variants are Van der Weiden, Van der Weijde, Van der Weyde,  and Van der Weyden. People with these names include:

Van der Weijden 
Annouk van der Weijden (born 1986), Dutch speed skater
Ellen van der Weijden-Bast (born 1971), Dutch water polo player
Maarten van der Weijden (born 1981), Dutch long-distance swimmer
Abraham van der Weijden (1743-1773), Freemason and Ship's captain

Van der Weide 
 (born 1973), Dutch chess grandmaster
 (born 1949), Dutch jazz bassist
Sander van der Weide (born 1976), Dutch field hockey player
Willeke van der Weide (born 1965), Dutch road racing cyclist

Van der Weyde / Van der Weijde 
Henry Van der Weyde (1838–1924), Dutch-born English painter and photographer (born Pieter Hendrik van der Weijde)
William van der Weyde (1871–1928), American photojournalist

Van der Weyden 
Harry van der Weyden (1868–1952), American Impressionist painter
Goswin van der Weyden (1455–1543), Flemish Renaissance painter
Rogier van der Weyden (1399/1400–1464), Early Netherlandish painter

See also
9576 van der Weyden, a main belt asteroid named after Rogier van der Weyden

References

Dutch-language surnames
Dutch toponymic surnames